Pablo Mazza (born 21 December 1987) is an Argentine footballer who plays as a left winger for Douglas Haig.

Club career
He started from the lower Argentinian divisions with Juventud de Pergamino. After playing with the club showing great potential it was matter of time to generate interest by several clubs both in Argentina and Europe (including Vitesse Arnhem, SC Heerenveen as well as Genoa, Juventus and Ajax). In 2007, he went on trials to the giants River Plate and stayed. He signed his first contract, and served in the reserve-team till he stopped due to a severe injury. In early 2009, during the first matches with River Plate reserves, he showed his talent, but suffered a broken ankle in a training from teammate Mauro Diaz took him more than four months of recovery. After recovering from his injury and take physical and footballing rhythm while on loan at his home club Juventud de Pergamino, he returned to the preseason with the River Plate reserve squad.

In January 2012, Paul Mazza sign Douglas Haig playing in Primera B Nacional, after a test run, making his debut at United Youth University of San Luis in an honoured match for Omar Jorge, entering the second half.

In the summer of 2014, after playing for the club for two seasons, he refused the club's offer for renewal, and signed a four years' contract with Greek Super League side Asteras Tripoli.

References

External links
Ollerfutbol

1989 births
Living people
Argentine footballers
Argentine expatriate footballers
Primera Nacional players
Super League Greece players
Club Atlético Douglas Haig players
Asteras Tripolis F.C. players
Expatriate footballers in Greece
Association football wingers
People from Pergamino
Sportspeople from Buenos Aires Province